Jenni Hucul (born May 17, 1988) is a Canadian bobsledder who has competed since 2007. She won the silver medal in the mixed bobsleigh-skeleton team event at the 2008 FIBT World Championships in Altenberg, Germany.

Jenni was also a star track & field athlete. She is the Canadian Youth (17 and under) record holder in the 100m, which she set when she won the Canadian Junior Championships with a time of 11.54 +1.4 m/s in Saskatoon on July 4, 2003, running in a higher age category. She also won the Canadian Junior championships in the 100m Hurdles in 2007.

References

 FIBT profile
 Athletics Canada: Rankings for 100 Metre Youth Girls Outdoor

1988 births
Living people
Canadian female bobsledders
21st-century Canadian women